Roald Amundsen was a Norwegian polar explorer.

Amundsen may also refer to:

 Amundsen (surname), people with the surname
Sophie Amundsen, a fictional character from the novel Sophie's World
 Amundsen (crater), a large crater on the Moon
 Amundsen (film), a 2019 Norwegian film about Roald Amundsen
 CCGS Amundsen, a Canadian Coast Guard icebreaker and Arctic research ship
 Amundsen High School, in Chicago, Illinois
 Amundsen, one of two probes on the NASA Deep Space 2 mission

See also
 List of things named after Roald Amundsen
 Amundsen–Scott South Pole Station
 Amundson (disambiguation)